Adenopappus is a genus of plants in the family Asteraceae described as a genus in 1840.

There is only one known species, Adenopappus persicaefolius, endemic to central Mexico (Hidalgo, Nayarit, etc.).

References

Monotypic Asteraceae genera
Endemic flora of Mexico
Flora of Hidalgo (state)
Flora of Nayarit
Taxa named by George Bentham